The Ministry of Internal Affairs is a cabinet-level government ministry of Uganda. It is responsible for the facilitation of "legal and orderly movement of persons to and from Uganda, regulate the residence of immigrants in the country, verify and process Uganda citizenship and enforce national and regional immigration laws for the development and security of Uganda". The ministry is headed by a cabinet minister, currently General Kahinda Otafire. He is assisted by a Minister of State, currently Gen. David Muhoozi.

Location
The headquarters of the ministry are located at 75 Jinja Road, in the Central Division of Kampala, the capital and largest city of Uganda. The coordinates of the ministry headquarters are: 0°19'08.0"N, 32°35'49.0"E (Latitude:0.318889; Longitude:32.596944).

Organisational structure
The ministry is divided into three directorates and four departments:

 Directorate of Community Service
 Directorate of Government Analytical Laboratory
 Directorate of Citizenship and Immigration Control
 Bureau of Non-Governmental Organisations
 National Community Service Programme
 National Focal Point
 Department of Finance & Administration

Affiliated government agencies
The ministry works closely with these government agencies and entities.

 Directorate of Citizenship and Immigration Control
 Uganda Police Force
 Uganda Prisons
 Justice Law and Order Sector
 National Identification and Registration Authority (NIRA)
 Uganda Investment Authority
 Uganda Tourism Board
 Makerere University

See also
List of Ministers of Internal Affairs of Uganda
Politics of Uganda
Cabinet of Uganda

References

External links
 Official website

Internal Affairs
Uganda